Saint Francis is an unincorporated community in Marion County, in the U.S. state of Kentucky.  The ZIP Code for Saint Francis is 40062.

History
Saint Francis was originally called Chicago, and under the latter name was incorporated in 1870 soon after the railroad was extended to that point.

References

Unincorporated communities in Marion County, Kentucky
Unincorporated communities in Kentucky